Yonsa may refer to:

 Yonsa, a brand name for Abiraterone acetate, used by Sun Pharmaceuticals and Churchill Pharmaceuticals 
 Yonsa County, in North Korea
 Yonsa-ri, city in Changwon, South Korea (Around 330 kilometres southeast of Seoul)